Bernd Eichmann (born 12 February 1966) is a retired German football defender and later manager.

References

1966 births
Living people
German footballers
SV Saar 05 Saarbrücken players
1. FC Saarbrücken players
FC 08 Homburg players
SV Elversberg players
Association football defenders
Bundesliga players
2. Bundesliga players
German football managers
SV Elversberg managers
1. FC Saarbrücken managers